Rod McCary (born April 15, 1941) is an American commercial, film and television actor.

Born in St. Cloud, Minnesota. McCary attended at Cathedral High School and University of Denver. He began his career in 1970, as appearing in the film The Christine Jorgensen Story, where he played the role of "Jess Warner".

Later in his career, McCary guest-starred in numerous television programs including Three's Company, It's a Living, Highway to Heaven, Columbo, Fantasy Island, Murder, She Wrote, Mama's Family, Dear John, Parks and Recreation, Family Ties, Growing Pains, The Mod Squad, Alice and Hart to Hart. He also starred and co-starred in films, such as, Herbie Rides Again, Night of the Demons 2, Stewardess School, Down 'n Dirty, Terror Among Us, Cheaper to Keep Her and 976-Evil II. In 1975, McCary left the soap opera television series General Hospital, with four other actors.

McCary had also starred in television programs including Harper Valley P.T.A., playing the role of "Bobby Taylor", Just Our Luck, playing the role of "Nelson Marriott" and Shell Game, playing the role of "Bill Bower". He also played tennis at the Plummer Park, from 1970.

References

External links 

Rotten Tomatoes profile

1941 births
Living people
People from St. Cloud, Minnesota
Male actors from Minnesota
American male film actors
American male television actors
American male soap opera actors
20th-century American male actors
21st-century American male actors
University of Denver alumni